Gaetano Kanizsa (18 August 1913 – 13 March 1993) was an Italian psychologist and artist of Jewish and Slovenian Catholic descent who last served as a founder of the Institute of Psychology of Trieste.

Biography

Gaetano Kanizsa was born on 18 August 1913 in Trieste, Austria-Hungary to a Hungarian-Jewish father from Nagybecskerek and a Slovene Catholic mother from Bovec. His surname is analogous to the Hungarian town Kanizsa (now Nagykanizsa).

He attended the classic lyceum and got the laurea (post-secondary academic degree) at the University of Padova in 1938, writing a thesis about eidetic memory. In 1947 he became a teaching assistant in the University of Florence. In 1953 he returned to Trieste with the role of full Professor at the University of Trieste, which he held for 30 years. He retired from academic life in 1988 and continued research until 1993, the year of his death.

Psychology
A dominant figure in Italian psychology, Kanizsa became famous in the 70s, after having published an article about illusory contours (Scientific American, 1976) and the book Organization in Vision (1979). A figure in which three illusory contours form a triangle is known as a Kanizsa triangle.

To his scientific interest, Kanizsa added his painting activity.

Bibliography
 Organization in Vision: Essays on Gestalt Perception, Praeger Publishers, 1979, 
 Grammatica del vedere. Saggi su percezione e Gestalt, Il Mulino, Bologna, 1997
 Percezione, linguaggio, pensiero (Perception, speech, thought) by Gaetano Kanizsa, Paolo Legrenzi, M. Sonino, Il Mulino, Bologna, 1983
 Vedere e pensare (Seeing and thinking), Il Mulino, Bologna, 1991

External links
 Some of Kanizsa's paintings on https://web.archive.org/web/20080326194224/http://www.psico.univ.trieste.it/kanizsa/catalogo/catalogo.php3

20th-century Italian Jews
Italian Roman Catholics
Converts to Roman Catholicism from Judaism
Gestalt psychologists
Italian psychologists
Hungarian scientists
Italian people of Hungarian descent
Italian people of Slovene descent
1993 deaths
1913 births
20th-century psychologists